Clarence E. Swanson (March 15, 1898 – December 3, 1970) was an American football player.  He was elected to the College Football Hall of Fame in 1973.

References

1898 births
1970 deaths
Nebraska Cornhuskers football players
College Football Hall of Fame inductees
American football ends
People from Wakefield, Nebraska